Mary Deros is a municipal politician in Montreal, Quebec, Canada. She has represented Parc-Extension on Montreal city council since 1998.

Deros serves on the Montreal executive committee in Michael Applebaum's administration with responsibility for cultural communities. She was previously an executive committee member in the administrations of Pierre Bourque and Gérald Tremblay. Originally elected as a member of Vision Montreal, Deros subsequently joined Union Montreal before becoming an independent councillor in December 2012; in June 2013, she reaffiliated with the new Équipe Denis Coderre.

Early life and career
Deros was born in Athens, Greece, to a family of Greek and Armenian heritage. During the Armenian genocide, her father escaped Turkey to live on the Greek island of Samos. She moved with her family to Montreal in 1958, when she was seven years old. She is fluent in Greek, Armenian, French, and English and was a well-known volunteer in Montreal's Park Extension District, before launching her political career.

Political career

Municipal politics
Bourque administration
Deros was first elected to Montreal city council for the Parc-Extension division in the 1998 municipal election. Vision Montreal won a council majority in this election under Mayor Bourque's leadership, and Deros was appointed to the executive committee in November 1998 with responsibility for sports, leisure, social development, and neighbourhoods. She also served on the executive committee of the Montreal Regional Health Board. She oversaw the conversion of some municipal baseball fields to soccer parks in 2000, arguing that soccer was becoming a more popular sport in the city. In 2001, she played a major role in organizing Montreal's Greek Independence Day parade.

In September 2000, Deros was appointed as a city representative on the newly formed Montreal Metropolitan Community regional government. In the same period, she supported Mayor Bourque's campaign to merge all Island of Montreal communities into a single municipal government.

Tremblay administration
Deros was re-elected in the 2001 municipal election, in which Vision Montreal was defeated by Gérald Tremblay's Montreal Island Citizens Union (MICU). She stood down from the executive committee with the rest of the Bourque administration and served as an opposition member. She was re-elected to a third term in 2005.

In 2007, Deros led a successful campaign to prevent Montreal's historic Park Avenue from being renamed after former Quebec premier Robert Bourassa. She also campaigned for an indoor soccer venue in the same period.

After serving as a Vision Montreal councillor for nine years, Deros joined Mayor Tremblay's renamed Union Montreal in December 2007. She said that she had considered the move over several months, commenting, "Ever since Mr. Bourque left [in 2006], the party hasn't been the same." On 28 January 2009, Tremblay re-appointed Deros to the Montreal executive committee with responsibility for community, social development, and families.

Deros was re-elected to a fourth term in the 2009 municipal election and was given responsibility for cultural communities following an executive committee shuffle in November 2009. In April 2011, she was given additional responsibilities for youth.

Applebaum and Blanchard administrations
Gérald Tremblay resigned as mayor of Montreal in November 2012 and was replaced by Michael Applebaum. Deros continued as a member of the executive committee, keeping responsibility for cultural communities while relinquishing the youth portfolio. She resigned from Union Montreal on 5 December 2012, saying that she preferred the new mayor's collegial approach to government. Deros kept her position on the executive committee after Laurent Blanchard succeeded Applebaum as interim mayor in June 2013.

By virtue of holding her city council seat, Deros also serves on the Villeray—Saint-Michel—Parc-Extension borough council.

Federal and provincial politics
The Montreal Gazette reported in February 2003 that Deros was considering a candidacy for the provincial Action démocratique du Québec. This rumour came to nothing. She sought the Quebec Liberal Party nomination for a by-election in Laurier-Dorion the following year, but withdrew from the contest prior to the nomination meeting.

In 2007, Deros sought the Liberal Party of Canada nomination in Papineau for the next Canadian federal election. She finished second against Justin Trudeau.

Electoral history

References

External links
Municipal biography

Living people
Montreal city councillors
Greek emigrants to Canada
Greek people of Armenian descent
Canadian people of Armenian descent
People from Villeray–Saint-Michel–Parc-Extension
Women in Quebec politics
Women municipal councillors in Canada
21st-century Canadian politicians
21st-century Canadian women politicians
Year of birth missing (living people)
Politicians from Athens